The 2017 ZS-Sports China International Challenger was a professional tennis tournament played on clay courts. It was the 2nd edition of the tournament which was part of the 2017 ATP Challenger Tour. It took place in Qingdao, China between 17 and 23 April 2017.

Singles main-draw entrants

Seeds

 1 Rankings are as of April 10, 2017.

Other entrants
The following players received wildcards into the singles main draw:
  Bai Yan
  He Yecong
  Sun Fajing
  Wang Aoxiong

The following player received entry into the singles main draw using a protected ranking:
  Daniel Muñoz de la Nava

The following players received entry from the qualifying draw:
  Félix Auger-Aliassime
  Denys Molchanov
  Oscar Otte
  Peter Torebko

Champions

Singles

 Janko Tipsarević def.  Oscar Otte 6–3, 7–6(11–9).

Doubles

 Gero Kretschmer /  Alexander Satschko def.  Andreas Mies /  Oscar Otte 2–6, 7–6(8–6), [10–3].

References

ZS-Sports China International Challenger
2017 in Chinese tennis
Sport in Qingdao